Janine Leroux-Guillaume (1927-2018) was a Canadian master printer but also worked in other media including painting, collage and sculpture.

Career 
Leroux-Guillaume (born at St. Hermas, County of Deux-Montagnes, P.Q.) studied engraving at the School of Graphic Arts in Montreal and
at the École des beaux-arts de Montréal with Madame Charlebois and Albert Dumouchel (graduated from the Beaux-Arts, 1954). Afterwards, she
travelled in Europe and studied at the Atelier Lacourière in Paris in 1959. She exhibited her work in  Ljubljana, Yugoslavia, in 1960 and at the Montreal Museum of Fine Arts; the Society of Canadian Painter-Etchers and Engravers, also at Winnipeg, Hamilton, and Toronto. She
also illustrated books of poetry. In 1964 she received a scholarship from the Department of Education of Quebec. Her work is included in the collections of the National Gallery of Canada, the Musée d'art contemporain de Montréal, the Musée national des beaux-arts du Québec and McMaster University in Hamilton. She taught plastic arts for the Catholic School Commission for a
number of years also engraving at the École des beaux-arts de Montréal.

Leroux-Guillaume died in Montreal, Quebec, two days after the opening of a retrospective exhibition of her work at the Center d'art Diane-Dufresne, in Repentigny in 2018.

References 
  
 

  

21st-century Canadian women artists 
1927 births 
21st-century Canadian artists
2018 deaths
Canadian printmakers